School City of Hammond is a school district serving the city of Hammond, Indiana, United States.

School
The school year is divided into semesters. All students are also required to wear school uniforms.

Schools
All schools are in Hammond.

High schools
 Hammond Central High School
 Morton High School
 Area Career Center

Middle and high schools
 George Rogers Clark Jr./Sr. High School (Hammond, IN)
 Donald E Gavit Jr./Sr. High School

Middle schools
 Henry W. Eggers Middle School
 Scott Middle School

Primary schools
Edison Elementary School
Benjamin Franklin Elementary School
Warren G. Harding Elementary School
Joseph Hess Elementary School
Washington Irving Elementary School
Thomas Jefferson Elementary School
Kenwood Elementary School
Lincoln Elementary School
Maywood Elementary School
Morton Elementary School
Frank O'Bannon Elementary School
Lew Wallace Elementary School

References

External links
 School City of Hammond

Education in Lake County, Indiana
School districts in Indiana
Hammond, Indiana